First cabinet of Maher Pasha was one of the governments of the Kingdom of Egypt. It was the last cabinet in the reign of King Fuad and the first one in the reign of King Farouk. It was headed by Aly Maher Pasha and existed between 31 January and May 1936. It replaced the government headed by Mohamed Tawfik Naseem Pasha which resigned on 22 January 1936. The cabinet was formed following the agreement of the political parties and was a caretaker government.

On 9 May 1936 Prime Minister Aly Maher Pasha submitted his resignation to Mohamed Aly who was the senior regent following the death of King Fuad in April. Mustafa Nahhas Pasha was assigned to form the next cabinet.

Cabinet members
The cabinet was composed of the following eight politicians. Only one of them, Ahmed Abdel Wahab Pasha, was a member of the previous cabinet and also, held the same post. Some of them held more than one ministerial post.

References

1936 establishments in Egypt
1936 disestablishments in Egypt
Maher
Cabinets established in 1936
Cabinets disestablished in 1936
Caretaker governments